Stuss or Jewish Faro is a card game, a variant of faro. In this version (played in house games, back rooms, and saloons), the cards are dealt from the dealer's hand, not from a shoe. Also, the house wins all the money when drawing two equal cards, as opposed to half in traditional faro. This greatly increases the house's advantage over its patrons.

Stuss was particularly popular in the late nineteenth century in New York City and Chicago in the United States, continuing until the time of World War I. It was frequently played in ethnic immigrant neighborhoods.

References
 The Little Giant Encyclopedia of Card Games, Sterling Publishing, New York 1995  p. 335-337 
 Scarne: Scarne on Card Games. How to Play and Win at Poker, Pinochle, Blackjack, Gin and Other Popular Card Games, 2nd ed.,  Courier Dover Publications, Mineola, N.Y. 2004, pp 173 –175,  
 Luc Sante: Low Life: Lures and Snares of Old New York. Farrar, Straus, & Giroux, New York  2003  ,
 Alex Garel-Frantzen:  Gangsters & Organized Crime in Jewish Chicago. The History Press, Charleston, S.C. 2013, p. 86 f, 2013 
 G. R. Williamson:  Frontier Gambling. The Games, the Gamblers & the Great Gambling Halls of the Old West.  Indian Head Publications,  E-Pub edition, 2012, 

19th-century gambling games
Banking games
American gambling games